Events in the year 1947 in India. It was a very eventful year as it became independent from the British crown, resulting in the split of India and Pakistan. Many people died during partition and India became a democracy.

Incumbents
 Emperor of India – George VI until 15 August
 King of India – George VI from 15 August
 Viceroy of India – The Viscount Wavell 
 Viceroy of India – The Viscount Mountbatten of Burma (21 February – 15 August)
 Governor-General of the Union of India – The Viscount Mountbatten of Burma (from 16 August)
 Prime Minister of India – Jawaharlal Nehru took office on 15 August

Events
 National income - 85,101 million
 1 March - Partition of India is finalised by Lord Mountbatten. Boundary Commission under Sir Radcliffe was setup to partition Punjab & Bengal. 
 15 March – Hindus and Muslims clash in Punjab.
 15 March - Lord Mountbatten attempts his first effort to stop the Partition of Bengal & conduct the partition of Muslim majority Kashmir.
 16 March - Maharaja Hari Singh of Kashmir disapproves of Lord Mountbatten's proposal.
 25 March - Lord Mountbatten attempts his second effort to stop the Partition of Bengal & conduct the partition of Muslim-majority Kashmir.
 26 March - Jawaharlal Nehru disapproves of Lord Mountbatten's proposal but Muhammad Ali Jinnah accepts the proposal of Lord Mountbatten.
 2 April - Lord Mountbatten attempts his third effort to stop the Partition of Bengal & conduct the partition of Muslim-majority Kashmir. Gandhi starts his fast to keep India united.
 5 April - Talks on stopping the Partition of Bengal & conducting the partition of Muslim-majority Kashmir fails as Jawaharlal Nehru & Maharaja Hari Singh disapprove of Lord Mountbatten's proposal. Proposal stands 2-1 in favour of the Partition of Bengal.
 15 April - On the Bengali new year's day, Lord Mountbatten attempts his last ditch effort to stop the Partition of Bengal & conduct the partition of Muslim-majority Kashmir. Sir Radcliffe lends support to Lord Mountbatten as the proposal stands tied 2-2.
 1 May - Shyama Prasad Mukherjee writes to Lord Mountbatten & Sir Radcliffe demanding a plebiscite to decide on the Partition of Bengal. Proposal stands 3-2 in favour of the Partition of Bengal. Lord Mountbatten comments "The Partition of Kashmir would have saved India-Pakistan conflicts. But it's hopeless as the India-Pakistan conflict will never end on Kashmir"
 17 May – Tripura & Coochbehar are officially ceded to India after 200 years of independent rule.
 18 May - Gandhi gives approval to the Partition of India after massive riots break out in Punjab & Bengal
23 May - The Partition of Bengal was finalized. West Bengal was slated to have Jessore, Khulna, Barisal, & Dinajpur Districts along with other Western districts of Undivided Bengal. A Total of  area was given to West Bengal.
 31 May - First Illegal Plebiscite to decide on the Partition of Bengal happens. Kolkata, Sunderbans, Murshidabad, Malda, Jessore, Khulna, Barisal, Kushtia, Pabna, Rajshahi, & Rangpur divisions of Bengal vote.
 1 June - Second Illegal Plebiscite to decide on the Partition of Bengal happens. Dhaka, Mymensingh, Sylhet, & Chattogram (Chittagong) vote in favour of joining East Pakistan.
 5 June - Shyama Prasad Mukherjee loses Plebiscite. He comes in 3rd position after winner Hussein Suhrawardy & runner-up Syed Muzaffar Ahmed. Kolkata, Sunderbans, Murshidabad, Malda, Jessore, Khulna, Barisal, Kushtia, Pabna, Rajshahi, & Rangpur divisions marked selected to join East Pakistan.
 6 June - Gopalnath Mukherjee, Gopalnath Bhattacharya, & Chandi Upadhyay raid the second head office of Muslim League in Kolkata with 20,000 people to save Kolkata, Sunderbans,  Jessore, Khulna, & Barisal from going into East Pakistan. All Muslim League leaders abandon second head office in Kolkata & flee to Dhaka.
 6 June - Malda & Murshidabad, which were given to East Pakistan, were swapped with Jessore, Khulna, & Barisal. Kolkata was saved & Sunderbans was divided between India & East Pakistan. West Bengal looses  due to Illegal Plebiscite.
 7 August – The Bombay Municipal Corporation formally takes over the Bombay Electric Supply and Transport (BEST).
 15 August – British India is dissolved and the Dominion of India gains its independence from the United Kingdom. A largely Hindu India and a Muslim Pakistan are created by partitions of the subcontinent, with Punjab and Bengal divided along religious-demographic boundaries between the two. Hindu – Muslim riots break out along both the western and eastern borders. Mass transfer of refugees takes place from the successor states of India to Pakistan and vice versa. The monarch of Kashmir signs instrument of accession with India in the face of heavy attack from Pakistani tribals, but at the same time he had signed a Standstill agreement with Pakistan. Mountbatten remains the Governor-general of India as wished by the Indians and Jawaharlal Nehru becomes the first Prime Minister of India. Nehru unfurls the Indian tricolor on the ramparts of the Red Fort, symbolically marking the end of British colonial rule.
 August – October – Thousands massacred & 1 million migrations in Punjab.
 13 September – Prime Minister Nehru suggests the transfer of 10 million Hindus and Muslims between India and Pakistan.
 27 October – War breaks out between Indian and Pakistani forces in Kashmir.
 9 November – Junagadh joins the Dominion of India

Law
 10 August - Boundary Commission under Sir Radcliffe finally partitioned India.  of area in Punjab got divided with  going to West Pakistan (Only Pakistan since 1971). Remaining  joins India as East Punjab.  of area in Bengal got divided with  going to East Pakistan (Bangladesh since 1971). Remaining  joins India as West Bengal. (Later West Bengal lost  more area to Bihar, Assam, & Odisha in 1948-53).
Indian Independence Act
Industrial Disputes Act
Gauhati University Act
Roorkee University Act
Rubber (Production and Marketing) Act
Indian Nursing Council Act
Foreign Exchange Regulation Act
Armed Forces (Emergency Duties) Act
United Nations (Security Council) Act
United Nations (Privileges and Immunities) Act

Births
8 January – Harish Naval, international literary journal chief editor.
12 February – Jarnail Singh Bhindranwale, Sikh theologian and leader (died 1984).
19 June – Salman Rushdie, novelist.
1 July – Sharad Yadav, politician (died 2023)
5 July – Lalji Singh, molecular biologist. (died 2017).
15 August – Raakhee, Bollywood actress.
17 October – Simi Garewal, actress.

Deaths
13 May – Sukanta Bhattacharya, Bengali poet (born 1926).

See also 
 Bollywood films of 1947

References

 
India
Years of the 20th century in India